Gunnar Hjeltnes (December 25, 1922 – November 7, 2013) was a Norwegian alpine skier. He was born in Ulvik. He participated at the 1952 Winter Olympics in Oslo, where he placed 7th in downhill, and also competed in slalom and giant slalom. He became Norwegian champion in downhill in 1951. Hjeltnes died in November 2013 at the age of 90.

References

External links

1922 births
2013 deaths
Alpine skiers at the 1952 Winter Olympics
Norwegian male alpine skiers
Olympic alpine skiers of Norway
People from Hordaland
People from Ulvik
Sportspeople from Vestland